Jack Shafer (born November 14, 1957) is an American journalist who writes about media for Politico. Prior to joining Politico, he worked for Reuters and also edited and wrote the column "Press Box" for Slate, an online magazine. Before his stay at Slate, Shafer edited two city weeklies, Washington City Paper and SF Weekly. Much of Shafer's writing focuses on what he sees as a lack of precision and rigor in reporting by the mainstream media, which he says "thinks its duty is to keep you cowering in fright." One frequent topic is media coverage of the War on Drugs.

Libertarianism
Shafer has written supportively of libertarianism. He wrote, "Traditionally, the state censors and marginalizes voices while private businesses tend to remain tolerant." In 2000, he explained his political views as follows: "I agree with the Libertarian Party platform: much smaller government, much lower taxes, an end to income redistribution, repeal of the drug laws, fewer gun laws, a dismantled welfare state, an end to corporate subsidies, First Amendment absolutism, a scaled-back warfare state. (You get the idea.)"

Consistent with this perspective, on 20 April 2020 Shafer expressed opposition to the Local Journalism Sustainability Act, saying, "You wouldn't put a dead man on a ventilator, would you?"

Notes

External links
 Jackshafer.com
 

American libertarians
American male journalists
American columnists
Princeton University alumni
Slate (magazine) people
Living people
1957 births
Politico people